The men's parallel slalom competition of the FIS Snowboarding World Championships 2011 was held in La Molina, Spain on January 22, 2011. 52 athletes from 22 countries competed.

Results

Qualification
The following are the results of the qualification. Each participant takes one run on either of the courses. After the first run, only the top 32 are allowed a second run on the opposite course.

Elimination round

References

Parallel slalom, men's